The Shanxi Bronze Museum is a bronze-themed museum located in the Changfeng Business District of Taiyuan. It the branch museum of Shanxi Museum.

On July 27, 2019, the Shanxi Bronze Museum was officially opened in Taiyuan, Shanxi Province.  The Museum is China's first provincial-level bronze-themed museum.  It has a display area of 11,000 square meters.

References

Museums established in 2019
Museums in Shanxi
Buildings and structures in Taiyuan